Ben W. Joseph (born July 17, 1942) is an American politician in the state of Vermont. He is a member of the Vermont House of Representatives, sitting as a Democrat from the Grand Isle-Chittenden district, having been first elected in 2016.  He was previously a judge on the Vermont Superior Court from 1998 to 2010.

References

1945 births
Living people
People from North Hero, Vermont
Democratic Party members of the Vermont House of Representatives
University of Pennsylvania Law School alumni
21st-century American politicians